Willy Oskar Dressler (25 April 18767 November 1954) was a German writer on art and interior decoration. He was born in Berlin and died in Endeholz, Scharnhorst, Lower Saxony.

His principal works are:  
 Möbel im Zimmer der Neuzeit (1901)
 Moderne Silbergeräte (1902)
 Geschichte des Porzellans (1904)
 Kunstgewerbe oder angewandte Kunst in Beziehung zur künstlerischen Kultur (1910)
 Neugestaltung der Verwaltung der Kunstangelegenheiten im Reich und in den Bundesstaaten (1917)
 Der Eckstein in der Wirtschaft von den Werkleuten vergessen! (1921)

References
 

1876 births
1954 deaths
Writers from Berlin
German male writers